The King of Limbs: Live from the Basement is a 2011 live video album by the English alternative rock band Radiohead, performing their eighth album, The King of Limbs (2011). It was Radiohead's second performance for the series From the Basement, following In Rainbows – From the Basement (2008). The producer, Nigel Godrich, described it as an effort to record a different version of The King of Limbs and show it in a new light.

Music 
The video includes performances of all eight tracks from Radiohead's 2011 album The King of Limbs, plus the songs "The Daily Mail", "Staircase" and "Supercollider". It was recorded in Maida Vale Studios, London, and produced by Radiohead's longtime collaborator Nigel Godrich. Radiohead were joined by Clive Deamer on additional drums and percussion, and a horn section for several songs.

Godrich said the performance was "a very conscious attempt to do something special: to record the album again, once it had been rehearsed and played live, to show it in a different light ... for a record that was very mechanised and completely different".<ref>{{Cite web|date=2021-08-02|title=Nigel Godrich talks From the Basement'''s return, Radiohead webcasts, and more|url=https://pitchfork.com/news/nigel-godrich-talks-from-the-basement-return-radiohead-webcasts-and-more/|url-status=live|access-date=2021-08-02|website=Pitchfork|language=en-US}}</ref>

 Release The King of Limbs: Live from the Basement was broadcast on several TV channels internationally. The performances of "The Daily Mail" and "Staircase" were released as singles in 2011.

 Reception 

Reviewing The King of Limbs: Live From the Basement for AllMusic, Gregory Heaney wrote that "the session feels like the perfect environment for Radiohead to perform in, allowing them the freedom to relax and experiment with their sound without the pressure of a massive stadium audience to distract them from their music". In a 2015 article for Stereogum, Ryan Leas argued that it was superior to The King of Limbs'': "You hear muscle and movement and bodies existing where the now tapped-out ingenuity of Radiohead’s electronic impulses has begun to make their recorded music brittle."

Tracklist

 "Bloom" – 6:13
 "The Daily Mail" – 4:10
 "Feral" – 3:35
 "Little by Little" – 4:47
 "Codex" – 5:09
 "Separator" – 6:36
 "Lotus Flower" – 5:43
 "Staircase" – 5:06
 "Morning Mr Magpie" – 5:46
 "Give Up the Ghost" – 5:53

Bonus track

"Supercollider" – 5:41

Personnel

Radiohead
 Thom Yorke – voice, keyboard, guitar
 Jonny Greenwood – guitar, keyboard, laptop, drums
 Colin Greenwood – bass
 Ed O'Brien – guitar, FX, voice
 Philip Selway – drums

With
 Clive Deamer – drums, electronic drums

Recording
 Nigel Godrich – production , mixing
 Vern Moen – direction, editing
 Darrell Thorp – sound engineering
 Drew Brown – recording assistance
 Daniel Landin – direction of photography
 James Chaos – production 
 Dilly Gent – production 
 John Woollcombe – production 

Brass
 Noel Langley
 Yazz Ahmed
 Clare Moss
 Trevor Mires
 Oren Marshall
 Ben Castle
 Phil Todd

Design
 Steve Keros – stills photography
 Wildwood & Twain – artwork and layout

References

External links 
Official The King of Limbs website
Official Radiohead website

Radiohead video albums
2011 video albums
2011 live albums
Live video albums
Radiohead live albums
XL Recordings video albums
XL Recordings live albums